No Roots is the debut EP by German-Canadian-English singer Alice Merton, released on 3 February 2017 and produced by Alice Merton and Nicolas Rebscher. It was later released in the US on 6 April 2018.

Track listing

Charts

References

2017 debut EPs
Alice Merton albums